Márcio Henrique Barroso Araújo (born 12 October 1973 in Fortaleza, Ceará) is a male beach volleyball player from Brazil. He won the gold medal in the men's beach team competition at the 2005 Beach Volleyball World Championships in Berlin, Germany, partnering Fábio Luiz Magalhães.

Araújo represented his native country at the 2004 Summer Olympics in Athens, Greece, after having claimed the bronze medal alongside Benjamin Insfran at the 2003 Beach Volleyball World Championships in Rio de Janeiro, Brazil.

References 

1973 births
Living people
Brazilian men's beach volleyball players
Beach volleyball players at the 2004 Summer Olympics
Beach volleyball players at the 2008 Summer Olympics
Olympic beach volleyball players of Brazil
Olympic silver medalists for Brazil
Olympic medalists in beach volleyball
Medalists at the 2008 Summer Olympics
Sportspeople from Fortaleza
Beach volleyball defenders